Karaulkhana is a village in the Davachi Rayon of Azerbaijan. The time zone in Karaulkhana is Asia/Baku.

References 

Populated places in Shabran District